Rubina Arif is a Pakistani actress and producer. She is known for her roles in dramas Ishq Nachaya, Kab Mere Kehlaoge, Qismat Ka Likha and Kam Zarf.

Early life
Rubina was born on July 15, 1968 in Lahore, Pakistan. She completed her studies Punjab University, she did a masters in Psychology.

Career
She made her debut as an actress in 2000. She was known for her work in drama Ishq Nachaya. She was a very well known actress. She also did modeling and commercials. She was also known for her comedy roles in Hum Sub Umeed Se Hain and known for her multiple roles in Hum Sub Umeed Se Hain. Since then she appeared in dramas Kab Mere Kehlaoge, Bechari Nadia, Qismat, Mera Kiya Qasoor and Kam Zarf.

Personal life
Rubina was married to Taslim Arif a cricketer, they married in 1981 and has three children two sons and one daughter. Her son Ainan is married to actress Anoushay Abbasi.

Filmography

Television

Telefilm

Film

References

External links
 
 

1968 births
20th-century Pakistani actresses
Living people
Pakistani television actresses
21st-century Pakistani actresses
Pakistani film actresses